William Aylett may refer to:

William Edward "Bill" Aylett (1900–1976), Australian politician
Aylett family of Virginia, which included three noted family members named William Aylett